"Sherri, Don't Fail Me Now!" is a song by British rock band Status Quo, released as a single in October 1994. It was included on their 21st studio album, Thirsty Work.

Track listings 
Cassette and 7-inch red vinyl
 "Sherri, Don't Fail Me Now!" (edit) (Bown, Edwards) (2.51)
 "Beautiful" (Rossi, Bown) (3.40)

CD1
 "Sherri, Don't Fail Me Now!" (edit) (Bown, Edwards) (2.51)
 "Beautiful" (Rossi, Bown) (3.40)
 "In the Army Now" (live) (Bolland, Bolland) (4.27)

CD2
 "Sherri, Don't Fail Me Now!" (extended version) (Bown, Edwards) (3.45)
 "Tossin' And Turnin'" (Rossi, Frost) (4.07)
 "Down to You" (Rossi, Bown) (3.13)

Charts

References 

Status Quo (band) songs
1994 singles
1994 songs
Polydor Records singles
Songs written by Andy Bown